Flanagan's Onions is an association football club from Hamilton, Bermuda. They play in the Bermudian First Division.

History
Founded in 1989 as MR Onions, the club were relegated from the Bermudian Premier Division in March 2015. They bounced back on the first attempt, after clinching promotion in March 2016 with two games left. They were, however, leapfrogged by Somerset Eagles on the final day of the season to finish it in 2nd place.

Historical list of coaches

  Dermot O'Sullivan (-)
  Micky Ward (2010–present)

References

External links
 Club page - Bermuda FA

Football clubs in Bermuda
Hamilton, Bermuda
1989 establishments in Bermuda
Association football clubs established in 1989